Bell Township, Kansas may refer to:

 Bell Township, Reno County, Kansas
 Bell Township, Rice County, Kansas

See also 
 List of Kansas townships
 Bell Township (disambiguation)

Kansas township disambiguation pages